The 2018–19 season was the 109th season of competitive football in Germany.

Promotion and relegation

Pre-season

Post-season

National teams

Germany national football team

Kits

2018–19 UEFA Nations League

2018–19 UEFA Nations League A Group 1

2018–19 UEFA Nations League fixtures and results

UEFA Euro 2020 qualifying

UEFA Euro 2020 qualifying Group C

UEFA Euro 2020 qualifying fixtures and results

Friendly matches

Germany women's national football team

Kits

2019 FIFA Women's World Cup qualification

2019 FIFA Women's World Cup qualification Group 5

2019 FIFA Women's World Cup qualification fixtures and results

2019 FIFA Women's World Cup

2019 FIFA Women's World Cup Group B

2019 FIFA Women's World Cup fixtures and results

Friendly matches

League season

Men

Bundesliga

Bundesliga standings

Relegation play-offs
All times are CEST (UTC+2).

First leg

Second leg

2–2 on aggregate. Union Berlin won on away goals and are promoted to the Bundesliga, while VfB Stuttgart are relegated to the 2. Bundesliga.

2. Bundesliga

2. Bundesliga standings

Relegation play-offs
All times are CEST (UTC+2).

First leg

Second leg

4–4 on aggregate. Wehen Wiesbaden won on away goals and are promoted to the 2. Bundesliga, while FC Ingolstadt are relegated to the 3. Liga.

3. Liga

3. Liga standings

DFB-Pokal

Final

DFL-Supercup

Women

Frauen-Bundesliga

Bundesliga standings

2. Frauen-Bundesliga

2. Bundesliga standings

DFB-Pokal Frauen

Final

German clubs in Europe

UEFA Champions League

Group stage

Group A

Group D

Group E

Group F

Knockout phase

Round of 16

|}

UEFA Europa League

Qualifying phase and play-off round

Second qualifying round

|}

Third qualifying round

|}

Play-off round

|}

Group stage

Group A

Group B

Group H

Knockout phase

Round of 32

|}

Round of 16

|}

Quarter-finals

|}

Semi-finals

|}

UEFA Women's Champions League

Knockout phase

Round of 32

|}

Round of 16

|}

Quarter-finals

|}

Semi-finals

|}

References

 
Seasons in German football
2018 sport-related lists